The Société internationale forestière et minière du Congo (French; literally the "International Forestry and Mining Company of the Congo"), known as Forminière, was a lumber and mining company in the Belgian Congo (modern-day Democratic Republic of the Congo). Founded by Jean Jadot in 1906, the company began diamond mining in Kasai in 1913. At its height, Forminière was involved in gold and silver mining, cotton, palm and rubber cultivation, farming, sawmilling and even owned shops. The Belgian colonial state co-owned 50 percent of the company's capital, the rest being held largely by American shareholders.

For the length of its existence, from 1913 to 1961, Forminière had a monopoly on diamond production in Kasai.

Forminière and its rival, the Société minière de Beceka (Mibeka), later changed to "de Bakwanga" (MIBA), dominated the production of diamonds in the Belgian Congo. In 1959, Forminière's production of diamonds rose to 425,234 carats. However, after the 1960 independence of Congo and unrest in the region, company operations soon ceased. Forminière was the  principal corporate supporter of the secessionist state of South Kasai and received concessions from its government in exchange for financial support.

See also

Thomas Fortune Ryan
Societé Minière de Bakwanga
Diamang (Angola)
Union Minière du Haut Katanga (UMHK)
South Kasai

References

Bibliography
 Forminière 1906-1956, Brussels, Ed. L. Cuypers, 1956, 211p.

 
Archive International Forestry and Mining Company of the Congo, Royal Museum for Central Africa

History of the Democratic Republic of the Congo
Non-renewable resource companies established in 1913
Defunct companies of Belgium
Mining companies of the Democratic Republic of the Congo
Defunct mining companies
Belgian Congo
Diamond mining companies of the Democratic Republic of the Congo
Gold mining companies of the Democratic Republic of the Congo
Silver mining companies
1913 establishments in the Belgian Congo
Non-renewable resource companies disestablished in 1961
1961 disestablishments in the Republic of the Congo (Léopoldville)